The Battle of Jiangnan (1860), also known as the Second rout of the Jiangnan Battalion was a battle between the Qing government's Green Standard Army and the army of the Taiping Heavenly Kingdom during the Taiping Rebellion. The Green Standard Army twice attempted to besiege Nanjing, capital of the Taiping Heavenly Kingdom, but was unable to break through. To break the siege of Nanjing, the Taiping forces maneuvered to divert Qing forces by sacking Hangzhou, before quickly moving back to Nanjing to counter-encircle the Qing siege forces and routing the Green Standard Army garrison completely, breaking the siege of Nanjing.

Jiangnan
The eastern campaign began in 9 February. Gen. Li Xiucheng of the rebel forces encircled the region of Jiangnan. They approached the Zhejiang provincial capital, Hangzhou, disguised as Qing troops. At Hangzhou, the 60,000 Taiping troops were outnumbered by Qing defenders, so they used several deception tricks such as placing hundreds of flags on a hill giving the impression of large numbers. The city walls were destroyed with explosives on 19 March, and the city was taken soon after. The Mayor of Hangzhou committed suicide after the loss.

Li's daring act attracted the attention of Zhang Guoliang, who ordered Gen. Tidu Zhang Youliang, in command of 36,000 troops, to track Li's corps. Li routed Zhang's troops and crippled Army Group Jiangnan. When Zhang Youliang arrived in Hangzhou he believed that Li was occupying the city, but Li's corps had left two days earlier on 19 March and attacked another city while waiting for reinforcements.

In Nanjing Hong Rengan ordered Chen Yucheng's troops to cross the river. Chen commanded over 100,000 men along the river and on 29 April he received the signal to attack from Hong Rengan and began the crossing.

Zeng Guofan
When Chief commander Zhang Guoliang and Imperial Commissioner Her Chyun died the Qing government promoted Zeng Guofan. This changed the course of the war in favor of the Qing and their western allies.

See also
First Rout of the Jiangnan Battalion
Second Opium War
Draft History of Qing

References
 
 
 

Jiangnan
1860 in China
Jiangnan
History of Nanjing
Green Standard Army